Stefan Smith (born August 11, 1989) is an Antiguan footballer who currently plays for Charlotte Eagles in the USL Professional Division.

Club career
Smith began his career in 2008 playing for Old Road FC in the Antigua and Barbuda Premier Division. He was the top scorer in the league in his debut season in 2008/09, scoring 17 goals, and helped the team finish as runners-up to Bassa in 2009/10.

In 2011 Smith transferred to the new Antigua Barracuda FC team prior to its first season in the USL Professional Division. He made his debut for the Barracudas on April 17, 2011, in the team's first ever competitive game, a 2–1 loss to the Los Angeles Blues.

International goals
Scores and results list Antigua and Barbuda's goal tally first.

References

External links

1989 births
Living people
Antigua and Barbuda footballers
Antigua and Barbuda expatriate footballers
Antigua and Barbuda international footballers
Antigua Barracuda F.C. players
Charlotte Eagles players
Expatriate soccer players in the United States
USL Championship players
Antigua and Barbuda expatriate sportspeople in the United States
Old Road F.C. players
Association football forwards
Antigua and Barbuda under-20 international footballers
Antigua and Barbuda youth international footballers